Wenshang County is a county of southwestern Shandong province, People's Republic of China. It is under the administration of Jining City.

Administrative divisions
As 2012, this county is divided to 2 subdistricts, 7 towns and 6 townships.
Subdistricts
Wenshang Subdistrict
Zhongdu Subdistrict

Towns

Townships

Climate

References

External links 
 Official homepage

Counties of Shandong
Jining